Formula, Vol. 3 is the fifth studio album by American singer Romeo Santos, released on September 1, 2022, by Sony Music Latin. It is the third installment of Santos' Formula trilogy following Formula, Vol. 1 (2011) and Formula, Vol 2 (2014). Musically, it combines traditional bachata with innovative fusions exploring and experimenting dance, tropical house, hip hop and pop.  It features several guest appearances by international stars such as Rosalía and Justin Timberlake. Also, it contains guest appearances by artists of his natal Dominican Republic such as Toño Rosario, Lapiz Conciente, Ramon Orlando, Luis Miguel Del Amargue, Rubby Pérez, Fernando Villalona and Chris Lebron. The album contains 21 tracks, including 19 songs, one skit and an intro.

Recorded and written between 2020 and 2022, Formula, Vol. 3 received mixed to positive reviews by the critics. While some praised the production and features, others criticized the lyrics on some tracks and the approach of traditional bachata. Despite this, media and fans response positive to the album.

Formula Vol, 3 debut at the top ten of US Billboard 200 and reached the number one of US Tropical Albums, just like the previous two efforts of the trilogy.

Singles
"Sus Huellas" is the first single from the album. It was released on February 14, 2022, along with the music video. It peaked at number 10 on the Billboard Hot Latin Songs chart, and at number 1 on the Billboard Latin and Tropical Airplay charts. On the Monitor Latino charts, peaked at number 1 on the Colombia and Puerto Rico General charts. On its Dominican Republic charts, it peaked at number 5 in the General chart and at number 1 on the Bachata chart.

More songs were released as singles after the album's release.Three of them were released as separate singles on the same day. Five of them have music videos that were released on different dates. Three of these single are not bachata.

"Sin Fin" is the second single and features American singer Justin Timberlake. It was released on the same day as the album along with the music video. It peaked at number 100 on the Billboard Hot 100, at 15 on the Hot Latin Songs chart, and at number 1 on both the Billboard Latin and Tropical Airplay charts. It also peaked at number 1 on the Monitor Latino's Puerto Rico chart.

"El Pañuelo" is the third single and features Spaniard singer Rosalía. The music video was released the day after the album released on September 2, 2022. On the Billboard charts, it peaked at number 134 on the Billboard Global 200, at number 1 on at number 1 on both the Latin and Tropical Airplay chart, and at number 8 on the Spain Song chart. It also peaked at number 7 on Spain's PROMUSICAE chart and at number 1 on the Monitor Latino's Mexico chart.

"Bebo" is the fourth single. The music video was released on September 9, 2022. It peaked at 41 on the Hot Latin Songs chart and at number 16 on the Billboard Tropical Airplay chart.

"Me Extraño" is the fifth single and features Mexican singer Christian Nodal. It is the first non-bachata single of the album. The song is of the Regional Mexican genre. The music video was released on October 13, 2022. It peaked at number 46 on the Hot Latin Songs chart.

"SIRI" is the sixth single and features Dominican singer Chris Lebron. The music video was released on November 22, 2022. It peaked at number 18 on the Billboard Tropical Airplay chart. It also peaked at number 4 on the Monitor Latino's Dominican Republic chart.

"Solo Conmigo" is the seventh single . The music video was released on January 17, 2023. It also peaked at number 7 on the Monitor Latino's Dominican Republic Bachata chart. It peaked at 40 on the Hot Latin Songs chart and at number 4 on the Billboard Tropical Airplay chart.

"Suegra is the eighth single. The music video was released on March 3, 2023. It peaked at number 4 on the Monitor Latino's Dominican Republic Bachata chart. 

"Culpable" features Dominican Rapper Lapiz Conciente. The beat is from the song "I Got 5 on It" by Luniz featuring Michael Marshall. It peaked at number 5 on the Monitor Latino's Dominican Republic chart.

Critical reception 
Formula, Vol. 3 receive general positive reviews by the critics and fans alike. Amanda Alcantara from the Rolling Stone gave a positive review on an article titled Romeo Santos Is Both a Bachata Innovator and a Proud Traditionalist on ‘Formula Vol. 3’. On the same note, Thaina Garcia from Variety gave a positive review to the album a highlights the collaborations and guest appearances. On the same week of the album release, fans vote Formula Vol. 3 as the favorite new music of the week on Billboard website page. Also, Billboard staff ranked "Me extraño" with Christian Nodal as the best collaboration of the album.

On other hand, Isabelia Herrera from The New York Times gave a mixed review to the album and wrote an article titled Romeo Santos Reveals Another Volume of Boundary-Crossing Bachata. On the article she stated " soars when it expands the scope of the genre and the singer’s own approaches to its trademarks, but falls flat when it relies on backward-looking tropes".

Commercial performance 
The album debuted at number 10 on the US Billboard 200 with 26,000 units for the week ending September 17, 2022. The figures includes 2,000 units of pure sales. It was the fourth top-10 charting effort for the artist on the list. In the same week, it reached number one US Tropical Albums, just like the previous two efforts of the trilogy Formula, Vol. 1 (2011) and Formula, Vol. 2 (2014). Also, it debut at number two on US Billboard Top Latin Albums.

On the weekend of September 2–4, 2022, the album earned "Top Global Album Debut" and "Top Album Debut" in the United States on Spotify.The album was certified gold in Peru.

Track listing 

Notes
 "Skit" is written as: "Skit" (With a Special Character).

Charts

Weekly charts

Year-end charts

Certifications

References 

Romeo Santos albums
2022 albums
Sony Music Latin albums
Spanish-language albums
Sequel albums